Hamaticolax unisagittatus is a species of parasitic copepod belonging to the family Bomolochidae. It is a parasite on the gills of the common snook and has only been recorded in coastal waters off Rio de Janeiro State. In one study over half of the host fish sampled in this area carried this parasite.

Originally described in the genus Acantholochus, it was later transferred to the genus Hamaticolax.

References

Poecilostomatoida
Crustaceans of the Atlantic Ocean
Crustaceans described in 2003